Richard J. Lazarus is the Howard J. and Katherine W. Aibel Professor of Law at the Harvard Law School.

Early life and education

Lazarus graduated from University High School in Urbana, Illinois. He holds a B.S. in chemistry and a B.A. in economics from the University of Illinois (1976) and a J.D. from Harvard Law School (1979).  Prior to his arrival at Georgetown in 1996, Professor Lazarus taught at the Law School at Washington University in St. Louis (1989–1996) and the Indiana University Maurer School of Law (1983–1985) and worked in the Solicitor General's Office (1986–1989) and the Land and Natural Resources Division of the United States Department of Justice (1979–1983).

Career

Lazarus was previously the Justice William J. Brennan, Jr. Professor of Law at the Georgetown University Law Center,
where he focused his teaching and scholarship on environmental law, natural resources law, constitutional law, Supreme Court Advocacy, torts, property, and  administrative law. He was Faculty Director of the Supreme Court Institute, which provides moot court sessions for counsel in more than 90 percent of Supreme Court cases.
He is also the Stanley Legro Professor of Environmental Law at the University of San Diego, School of Law. He was appointed Executive Director of the National Commission on the BP Deepwater Horizon Oil Spill and Offshore Drilling in June 2010.

In November 2020, Lazarus was named a volunteer member of the Joe Biden presidential transition Agency Review Team to support transition efforts related to the United States Department of Justice.

Selected works 
 
 
 Lazarus, Richard (2021). The Rule of Five: Making Climate History at the Supreme Court. Cambridge, MA: Belknap Press. ISBN 978-0674260436.

References

External links

Year of birth missing (living people)
Living people
Georgetown University Law Center faculty
University of Illinois alumni
Harvard Law School alumni
Harvard Law School faculty
Washington University in St. Louis faculty
Indiana University Bloomington faculty